"The Unknown" is a song by American alternative metal band 10 Years. It was their second single off of their ninth studio album, Violent Allies. It peaked on the Billboard Mainstream Rock chart at number 20 in August 2021.

Charts

References

2020 songs
2021 singles
10 Years (band) songs
Songs written by Jesse Hasek
Song recordings produced by Howard Benson